Pantherodes colubraria, common name blotched leopard, is a species of moth in the family Geometridae.

Description
These moths have translucent yellow wings with leopard-like blotches.

Distribution
This species can be found in Colombia, Ecuador and Peru.

Subspecies
Pantherodes colubraria colubraria
Pantherodes colubraria viperaria (Thierry-Mieg, 1916)

References
  Learn about butterflies
 Discover Life
 Zipcodezoo

Geometridae
Moths described in 1858
Geometridae of South America
Moths of South America